Trisha M. Bailey is a Jamaican former student-athlete, philanthropist, and education activist. She represented UConn Huskies in cross country and track and field. She was the recipient of Luminary Awards in 2022 at the 29th Caribbean American Heritage Awards.

She is best known for her philanthropist activities which include donations to University of Connecticut, Portland, and improving education and development in Jamaica.

A report by Television Jamaica concluded that she is the “Richest Woman in Jamaica”.

Early life and education
Bailey was born in Jamaica.

In 1990, at age 13, she moved with her sister to the US to live with their mother and stepfather. Bailey was raised in East Hartford and now resides in Orlando.

She attended Weaver High School in Hartford and was a track and field athlete. She was a state open 800-meter champion while at the school.

In 1999, she graduated from University of Connecticut College of Liberal Arts and Sciences.

She did her MBA in 2005 and Ph.D. in 2010 in organizational leadership from University of Phoenix. 
She holds a Cardiology Certification from New York University Medical School and Pulmonary Certification from the University of Kentucky College of Medicine.

Career
In 1996, Trisha began her career by working as a service manager at Fleet Bank, Hartford, later moving to First Union National Bank, where she served until her transition to the Stock Market in 1999.

In 2005, she founded her own Medical Recruiting Company called Association Medical Recruiters.

She donated to fund research and treatments against blood cancer at The Leukemia and Lymphoma Society.

She gave financial aid and scholarships to 270 Caribbean students through her charity Bailey-Archie's Charitable Foundation.

She made the largest athletic donation in the history of University of Connecticut to renovate and expand the Hugh S. Greer Field House.

See also
 Caribbean American Heritage Awards

References

Living people
Jamaican women
Philanthropists
University of Phoenix alumni
Education activists
Jamaican activists
Jamaican female middle-distance runners
UConn Huskies athletes
College women's track and field athletes in the United States
University of Connecticut alumni
New York University Grossman School of Medicine alumni
Jamaican emigrants to the United States
People from East Hartford, Connecticut
Track and field athletes from Connecticut